Death Magic Doom is the tenth studio album by the Swedish epic doom metal band Candlemass.

History
The working title for this album was "Hammer of Doom", which is the name of the album's second track, but the idea was abandoned due to there being a German festival of the same name. The band recorded it in 2008, and was seeking a release on 27 March 2009. However, the album's release was delayed until 3 April 2009; the United States release date was 5 May 2009.

The bonus track "Lucifer Rising", was taken from the EP Lucifer Rising, released six months before the album.

Track listing

Personnel
Candlemass
 Robert Lowe - vocals
 Mats Björkman - rhythm guitar
 Lars Johansson - lead guitars
 Leif Edling - bass
 Jan Lindh - drums

Additional musicians
Carl Westholm - keyboards
Stefan Fandén - toypiano

Production
Chris Laney - engineer, mixing
Sören von Malmborg - mastering
Tomas Arfert - cover design and illustration

Charts

References

2009 albums
Candlemass (band) albums
Nuclear Blast albums